This is a list of the bird species recorded in the archipelago of Puerto Rico, which consists of the main island of Puerto Rico, two island municipalities off the east coast (Vieques and Culebra), three uninhabited islands off the west coast (Mona, Monito and Desecheo) and more than 125 smaller cays and islands.

The avifauna of Puerto Rico included a total of 385 species as of July 2022, according to Bird Checklists of the World. Of them, 201 are accidental, two have been extirpated, and one is believed to be extinct. Seventeen species are endemic. Non-native species are common; 43 listed here were introduced by humans. Individuals of many other species (mostly parrots, finches, and waxbills) are flying free, presumably after escaping or being released from captivity. For example, a 2018 study on introduced Psittacidae on the island found at least 46 species present, of which 24% are only found in the pet trade (captivity), 48% have been observed in the wild (but are not known to be breeding), and 28% are established (naturalized) and know to have bred or are currently breeding. Around 120 species breed in Puerto Rico while the majority of the others overwinter in the archipelago.

This list is presented in the taxonomic sequence of the Check-list of North and Middle American Birds, 7th edition through the 63rd Supplement, published by the American Ornithological Society (AOS). Common and scientific names are also those of the Check-list, except that the common names of families are from the Clements taxonomy because the AOS list does not include them.

The following tags have been used to highlight several categories of occurrence:

 (A) Accidental - a species that rarely or accidentally occurs in Puerto Rico
 (E) Endemic - a species endemic to Puerto Rico
 (Ex) Extirpated - a species that no longer occurs in Puerto Rico although populations exist elsewhere
 (I) Introduced - a species introduced to Puerto Rico as a consequence, direct or indirect, of human actions

Ducks, geese, and waterfowl
Order: AnseriformesFamily: Anatidae

The Anatidae include the ducks and most duck-like waterfowl, such as geese and swans. These birds are adapted to an aquatic existence with webbed feet, bills which are flattened to a greater or lesser extent, and feathers that are excellent at shedding water due to special oils.

 Black-bellied whistling-duck, Dendrocygna autumnalis (A)
 West Indian whistling-duck, Dendrocygna arborea
 Fulvous whistling-duck, Dendrocygna bicolor (A)
 White-faced whistling-duck, Dendrocygna bicolor (Ex)
 Snow goose, Anser caerulescens (A)
 Brant, Branta bernicla (A)
 Canada goose, Branta canadensis (A)
 Tundra swan, Cygnus columbianus (A)
 Wood duck, Aix sponsa (A)
 Garganey Spatula querquedula (A)
 Blue-winged teal, Spatula discors
 Cinnamon teal, Spatula cyanoptera (A)
 Northern shoveler, Spatula clypeata (A)
 Gadwall, Mareca strepera (A)
 Eurasian wigeon, Mareca penelope (A)
 American wigeon, Mareca americana (A)
 Mallard, Anas platyrhynchos (A)
 American black duck, Anas rubripes (A)
 White-cheeked pintail, Anas bahamensis
 Northern pintail, Anas acuta (A)
 Green-winged teal, Anas crecca (A)
 Canvasback, Aythya valisineria (A)
 Ring-necked duck, Aythya collaris (A)
 Tufted duck, Aythya fuligula (A)
 Lesser scaup, Aythya affinis (A)
 Bufflehead, Bucephala albeola (A)
 Hooded merganser, Lophodytes cucullatus (A)
 Red-breasted merganser, Mergus serrator (A)
 Masked duck, Nomonyx dominicus
 Ruddy duck, Oxyura jamaicensis

Guineafowl

Order: GalliformesFamily: Numididae

Guineafowls are a group of African seed-eating, ground-nesting birds resembling partridges, but with featherless heads and spangled gray plumage.

 Helmeted guineafowl, Numida meleagris (I)

New World quail
Order: GalliformesFamily: Odontophoridae

The New World quails are small, plump terrestrial birds only distantly related to the quails of the Old World, but named for their similar appearance and habits.

 Northern bobwhite, Colinus virginianus (I)

Pheasants, grouse, and allies
Order: GalliformesFamily: Phasianidae

The Phasianidae are a family of terrestrial birds which consists of quails, partridges, snowcocks, francolins, spurfowls, tragopans, monals, pheasants, peafowls, and jungle fowls. In general, they are plump (although they vary in size) and have broad, relatively short wings.

 Red junglefowl, Gallus gallus (I)

Flamingos
Order: PhoenicopteriformesFamily: Phoenicopteridae

Flamingos filter-feed on shellfish and algae. Their oddly shaped beaks are specially adapted to separate mud and silt from the food they consume and, uniquely, are used upside-down.

 American flamingo, Phoenicopterus ruber (A)

Grebes

Order: PodicipediformesFamily: Podicipedidae

Grebes are small to medium-large freshwater diving birds. They have lobed toes and are excellent swimmers and divers. However, they have their feet placed far back on the body, making them quite ungainly on land.

 Least grebe, Tachybaptus dominicus
 Pied-billed grebe, Podilymbus podiceps

Pigeons and doves

Order: ColumbiformesFamily: Columbidae

Pigeons and doves are stout-bodied birds with short necks and short slender bills with a fleshy cere.

 Rock pigeon, Columba livia (I)
 Scaly-naped pigeon, Patagioenas squamosa
 White-crowned pigeon, Patagioenas leucocephala
 Plain pigeon, Patagioenas inornata
 African collared-dove, Streptopelia roseogrisea (I)
 Eurasian collared-dove, Streptopelia decaocto (I)
 Diamond dove, Geopelia cuneata (I)
 Common ground dove, Columbina passerina
 Ruddy quail-dove, Geotrygon montana
 Key West quail-dove, Geotrygon chrysia
 Bridled quail-dove, Geotrygon mystacea (A)
 White-winged dove, Zenaida asiatica
 Zenaida dove, Zenaida aurita
 Mourning dove, Zenaida macroura

Cuckoos

Order: CuculiformesFamily: Cuculidae

The family Cuculidae includes cuckoos, roadrunners, and anis. These birds are of variable size with slender bodies, long tails, and strong legs. The Old World cuckoos are brood parasites.

 Smooth-billed ani, Crotophaga ani
 Yellow-billed cuckoo, Coccyzus americanus
 Mangrove cuckoo, Coccyzus minor
 Black-billed cuckoo, Coccyzus erythropthalmus (A)
 Puerto Rican lizard-cuckoo, Coccyzus vieilloti (E)

Nightjars and allies
Order: CaprimulgiformesFamily: Caprimulgidae

Nightjars are medium-sized nocturnal birds that usually nest on the ground. They have long wings, short legs, and very short bills. Most have small feet, of little use for walking, and long pointed wings. Their soft plumage is cryptically colored to resemble bark or leaves.

 Common nighthawk, Chordeiles minor (A)
 Antillean nighthawk, Chordeiles gundlachii
 Chuck-will's-widow, Antrostomus carolinensis (A)
 Puerto Rican nightjar, Antrostomus noctitherus (E)
 White-tailed nightjar, Hydropsalis cayennensis (A)

Potoos
Order: NyctibiiformesFamily: Nyctibiidae

Potoos are a group of large near passerine birds related to the nightjars and frogmouths. These are nocturnal insectivores which lack the bristles around the mouth found in the true nightjars.

 Northern potoo, Nyctibius jamaicensis (A)

Swifts
Order: ApodiformesFamily: Apodidae

Swifts are small birds which spend the majority of their lives flying. These birds have very short legs and never settle voluntarily on the ground, perching instead only on vertical surfaces. Many swifts have long swept-back wings which resemble a crescent or boomerang.

 Black swift, Cypseloides niger
 White-collared swift, Streptoprocne zonaris (A)
 Chimney swift, Chaetura pelagica (A)
 Common swift, Apus apus (A)
 Alpine swift, Apus melba (A)
 Antillean palm-swift, Tachornis phoenicobia (A)

Hummingbirds

Order: ApodiformesFamily: Trochilidae

Hummingbirds are small birds capable of hovering in mid-air due to the rapid flapping of their wings. They are the only birds that can fly backwards.

 Puerto Rican mango, Anthracothorax aurulentus
 Green mango, Anthracothorax viridis (E)
 Purple-throated carib, Eulampis jugularis (A)
 Green-throated carib, Eulampis holosericeus
 Ruby-throated hummingbird, Archilochus colubris (A)
 Vervain hummingbird, Mellisuga minima (A)
 Puerto Rican emerald, Riccordia maugaeus (E)
 Antillean crested hummingbird, Orthorhyncus cristatus

Rails, gallinules, and coots

Order: GruiformesFamily: Rallidae

Rallidae is a large family of small to medium-sized birds which includes the rails, crakes, coots, and gallinules. The most typical family members occupy dense vegetation in damp environments near lakes, swamps, or rivers. In general they are shy and secretive birds, making them difficult to observe. Most species have strong legs and long toes which are well adapted to soft uneven surfaces. They tend to have short, rounded wings and to be weak fliers.

 Clapper rail, Rallus crepitans
 Virginia rail, Rallus limicola (A)
 Sora, Porzana carolina (A)
 Common gallinule, Gallinula galeata
 American coot, Fulica americana
 Purple gallinule, Porphyrio martinicus
 Yellow-breasted crake, Hapalocrex flaviventer
 Black rail, Laterallus jamaicensis (A)

Limpkin
Order: GruiformesFamily: Aramidae

The limpkin is an odd bird that looks like a large rail, but is skeletally closer to the cranes.

 Limpkin, Aramus guarauna (Ex)

Stilts and avocets
Order: CharadriiformesFamily: Recurvirostridae

Recurvirostridae is a family of large wading birds which includes the avocets and stilts. The avocets have long legs and long up-curved bills. The stilts have extremely long legs and long, thin, straight bills.

 Black-necked stilt, Himantopus mexicanus
 American avocet, Recurvirostra americana (A)

Oystercatchers

Order: CharadriiformesFamily: Haematopodidae

The oystercatchers are large, obvious and noisy plover-like birds, with strong bills used for smashing or prising open molluscs.

American oystercatcher, Haematopus palliatus

Plovers and lapwings

Order: CharadriiformesFamily: Charadriidae

The family Charadriidae includes the plovers, dotterels, and lapwings. They are small to medium-sized birds with compact bodies, short thick necks, and long, usually pointed, wings. They are found in open country worldwide, mostly in habitats near water.

 Northern lapwing, Vanellus vanellus (A)
 Black-bellied plover, Pluvialis squatarola
 American golden-plover, Pluvialis dominica (A)
 Killdeer, Charadrius vociferus
 Semipalmated plover, Charadrius semipalmatus
 Piping plover, Charadrius melodus (A)
 Wilson's plover, Charadrius wilsonia
 Snowy plover, Charadrius nivosus

Jacanas
Order: CharadriiformesFamily: Jacanidae

The jacanas are a group of waders found worldwide within the tropical zone. They are identifiable by their huge feet and claws which enable them to walk on floating vegetation in the shallow lakes that are their preferred habitat.

 Northern jacana, Jacana spinosa (A)

Sandpipers and allies
Order: CharadriiformesFamily: Scolopacidae

Scolopacidae is a large diverse family of small to medium-sized shorebirds including the sandpipers, curlews, godwits, shanks, tattlers, woodcocks, snipes, dowitchers, and phalaropes. The majority of these species eat small invertebrates picked out of the mud or soil. Different lengths of legs and bills enable multiple species to feed in the same habitat, particularly on the coast, without direct competition for food.

 Upland sandpiper, Bartramia longicauda (A)
 Whimbrel, Numenius phaeopus (A)
 Eskimo curlew, Numenius borealis (A) (possibly extinct)
 Long-billed curlew, Numenius americanus (A)
 Eurasian curlew, Numenius arquata (A)
 Hudsonian godwit, Limosa haemastica (A)
 Marbled godwit, Limosa fedoa (A)
 Ruddy turnstone, Arenaria interpres
 Red knot, Calidris canutus (A)
 Ruff, Calidris pugnax (A)
 Stilt sandpiper, Calidris himantopus
 Curlew sandpiper, Calidris ferruginea (A)
 Sanderling, Calidris alba
 Dunlin, Calidris alpina (A)
 Baird's sandpiper, Calidris bairdii (A)
 Least sandpiper, Calidris minutilla
 White-rumped sandpiper, Calidris fuscicollis (A)
 Buff-breasted sandpiper, Calidris subruficollis (A)
 Pectoral sandpiper, Calidris melanotos
 Semipalmated sandpiper, Calidris pusilla
 Western sandpiper, Calidris mauri
 Short-billed dowitcher, Limnodromus griseus
 Long-billed dowitcher, Limnodromus scolopaceus (A)
 Wilson's snipe, Gallinago delicata (A)
 Spotted sandpiper, Actitis macularius
 Solitary sandpiper, Tringa solitaria 
 Lesser yellowlegs, Tringa flavipes
 Willet, Tringa semipalmata
 Spotted redshank, Tringa erythropus (A)
 Common greenshank, Tringa nebularia (A)
 Greater yellowlegs, Tringa melanoleuca
 Wilson's phalarope, Phalaropus tricolor (A)
 Red-necked phalarope, Phalaropus lobatus (A)
 Red phalarope, Phalaropus fulicarius (A)

Skuas and jaegers
Order: CharadriiformesFamily: Stercorariidae

The family Stercorariidae are, in general, medium to large birds, typically with gray or brown plumage, often with white markings on the wings. They nest on the ground in temperate and arctic regions and are long-distance migrants.

 Great skua, Stercorarius skua (A)
 South polar skua, Stercorarius maccormicki (A)
 Pomarine jaeger, Stercorarius pomarinus (A)
 Parasitic jaeger, Stercorarius parasiticus (A)
 Long-tailed jaeger, Stercorarius longicaudus (A)

Gulls, terns, and skimmers

Order: CharadriiformesFamily: Laridae

Laridae is a family of medium to large seabirds and includes gulls, kittiwakes, terns, and skimmers. They are typically gray or white, often with black markings on the head or wings. They have longish bills and webbed feet. Terns are a group of generally medium to large seabirds typically with gray or white plumage, often with black markings on the head. Most terns hunt fish by diving but some pick insects off the surface of fresh water. Terns are generally long-lived birds, with several species known to live in excess of 30 years. Skimmers are a small family of tropical tern-like birds. They have an elongated lower mandible which they use to feed flying low over the water surface and skimming the water for small fish.

 Black-legged kittiwake, Rissa tridactyla (A)
 Sabine's gull, Xema sabini (A)
 Bonaparte's gull, Chroicocephalus philadelphia (A)
 Black-headed gull, Chroicocephalus ridibundus (A)
 Little gull, Hydrocoloeus minutus (A)
 Laughing gull, Leucophaeus atricilla
 Franklin's gull, Leucophaeus pipixcan (A)
 Ring-billed gull, Larus delawarensis
 Herring gull, Larus argentatus (A)
 Yellow-legged gull, Larus michahellis (A)
 Lesser black-backed gull, Larus fuscus (A)
 Great black-backed gull, Larus marinus (A)
 Brown noddy, Anous stolidus
 Black noddy, Anous minutus (A)
 Sooty tern, Onychoprion fuscata
 Bridled tern, Onychoprion anaethetus
 Least tern, Sternula antillarum
 Gull-billed tern, Gelochelidon nilotica
 Caspian tern, Hydroprogne caspia (A)
 Black tern, Chlidonias niger
 White-winged tern, Chlidonias leucopterus (A)
 Roseate tern, Sterna dougallii
 Common tern, Sterna hirundo
 Arctic tern, Sterna paradisaea (A)
 Forster's tern, Sterna forsteri (A)
 Royal tern, Thalasseus maxima
 Sandwich tern, Thalasseus sandvicensis
 Black skimmer, Rynchops niger (A)

Tropicbirds
Order: PhaethontiformesFamily: Phaethontidae

Tropicbirds are slender white birds of tropical oceans with exceptionally long central tail feathers. Their long wings have black markings, as does the head.

 White-tailed tropicbird, Phaethon lepturus
 Red-billed tropicbird, Phaethon aethereus

Southern storm-petrels
Order: ProcellariiformesFamily: Oceanitidae

The storm-petrels are the smallest seabirds, relatives of the petrels, feeding on planktonic crustaceans and small fish picked from the surface, typically while hovering. The flight is fluttering and sometimes bat-like. Until 2018, this family's species were included with the other storm-petrels in family Hydrobatidae.

 Wilson's storm-petrel, Oceanites oceanicus (A)

Northern storm-petrels
Order: ProcellariiformesFamily: Hydrobatidae

Though the members of this family are similar in many respects to the southern storm-petrels, including their general appearance and habits, there are enough genetic differences to warrant their placement in a separate family.

 Leach's storm-petrel, Hydrobates leucorhous (A)

Shearwaters and petrels
Order: ProcellariiformesFamily: Procellariidae

The Procellariids are the main group of medium-sized "true petrels", characterized by united nostrils with medium septum and a long outer functional primary.

 Trindade petrel, Pterodroma arminjoniana (A)
 Black-capped petrel, Pterodroma hasitata (A)
 Cory's shearwater, Calonectris diomedea (A)
 Great shearwater, Ardenna gravis (A)
 Sooty shearwater, Ardenna griseus (A)
 Manx shearwater, Puffinus puffinus (A)
 Audubon's shearwater, Puffinus lherminieri
 Barolo shearwater, Puffinus baroli (A)

Storks
Order: CiconiiformesFamily: Ciconiidae

Storks are large, heavy, long-legged, long-necked wading birds with long stout bills and wide wingspans. They lack the powder down that other wading birds such as herons, spoonbills, and ibises use to clean off fish slime. Storks lack a pharynx and are mute.

 Wood stork, Mycteria americana (A)

Frigatebirds
Order: SuliformesFamily: Fregatidae

Frigatebirds are large seabirds usually found over tropical oceans. They are large, black, or black-and-white, with long wings and deeply forked tails. The males have colored inflatable throat pouches. They do not swim or walk and cannot take off from a flat surface. Having the largest wingspan-to-body-weight ratio of any bird, they are essentially aerial, able to stay aloft for more than a week.

 Magnificent frigatebird, Fregata magnificens

Boobies and gannets
Order: SuliformesFamily: Sulidae

The sulids comprise the gannets and boobies. Both groups are medium-large coastal seabirds that plunge-dive for fish.

 Masked booby, Sula dactylatra
 Brown booby, Sula leucogaster
 Red-footed booby, Sula sula
 Northern gannet, Morus bassanus (A)

Cormorants and shags
Order: SuliformesFamily: Phalacrocoracidae

Phalacrocoracidae is a family of medium to large coastal, fish-eating seabirds that includes cormorants and shags. Plumage coloration is varied with the majority having mainly dark plumage, some species being black-and-white, and a few being quite colorful.

 Double-crested cormorant, Nannopterum auritum (A)
 Neotropic cormorant, Nannopterum brasilianum (A)

Pelicans

Order: PelecaniformesFamily: Pelecanidae

Pelicans are very large water birds with a distinctive pouch under their beak Like other birds in the order Pelecaniformes, they have four webbed toes.

 American white pelican, Pelecanus erythrorhynchos (A)
 Brown pelican, Pelecanus occidentalis

Herons, egrets, and bitterns

Order: PelecaniformesFamily: Ardeidae

The family Ardeidae contains the bitterns, herons, and egrets. Herons and egrets are medium to large wading birds with long necks and legs. Bitterns tend to be shorter necked and more secretive. Members of Ardeidae fly with their necks retracted, unlike other long-necked birds such as storks, ibises, and spoonbills.

 American bittern, Botaurus lentiginosus (A)
 Least bittern, Ixobrychus exilis
 Great blue heron, Ardea herodias
 Great egret, Ardea alba
 Little egret, Egretta garzetta (A)
 Western reef-heron, Egretta gularis (A)
 Snowy egret, Egretta thula
 Little blue heron, Egretta caerulea
 Tricolored heron, Egretta tricolor
 Reddish egret, Egretta rufescens (A)
 Cattle egret, Bubulcus ibis
 Green heron, Butorides virescens
 Striated heron, Butorides striata (A)
 Black-crowned night-heron, Nycticorax nycticorax
 Yellow-crowned night-heron, Nyctanassa violacea

Ibises and spoonbills
Order: PelecaniformesFamily: Threskiornithidae

Threskiornithidae is a family of large terrestrial and wading birds which includes the ibises and spoonbills. They have long, broad wings with 11 primary and about 20 secondary feathers. They are strong fliers and, rather surprisingly, given their size and weight, very capable soarers.

 White ibis, Eudocimus albus (A)
 Scarlet ibis, Eudocimus ruber (A)
 Glossy ibis, Plegadis falcinellus (A)
 Roseate spoonbill, Platalea ajaja (A)

New World vultures

Order: CathartiformesFamily: Cathartidae

The New World vultures are not closely related to Old World vultures, but superficially resemble them because of convergent evolution. Like the Old World vultures, they are scavengers. However, unlike Old World vultures, which find carcasses by sight, New World vultures have a good sense of smell with which they locate carcasses.

 Black vulture, Coragyps atratus (A)
 Turkey vulture, Cathartes aura (I)

Osprey
Order: AccipitriformesFamily: Pandionidae

The family Pandionidae contains only one species, the osprey. The osprey is a medium-large raptor which is a specialist fish-eater with a worldwide distribution.

 Osprey, Pandion haliaetus

Hawks, eagles, and kites

Order: AccipitriformesFamily: Accipitridae

Accipitridae is a family of birds of prey, which includes hawks, eagles, kites, harriers, and Old World vultures. These birds have very large powerful hooked beaks for tearing flesh from their prey, strong legs, powerful talons, and keen eyesight.

 Swallow-tailed kite, Elanoides forficatus (A)
 Northern harrier, Circus hudsonius (A)
 Western marsh harrier, Circus aeruginosus (A)
 Sharp-shinned hawk, Accipiter striatus 
 Bald eagle, Haliaeetus leucocephalus (A)
 Mississippi kite, Ictinia mississippiensis (A)
 Common black hawk, Buteogallus anthracinus
 Ridgway's hawk, Buteo ridgwayi (A)
 Broad-winged hawk, Buteo platypterus
 Red-tailed hawk, Buteo jamaicensis

Barn-owls
Order: StrigiformesFamily: Tytonidae

Barn-owls are medium to large owls with large heads and characteristic heart-shaped faces. They have long strong legs with powerful talons.

 Barn owl, Tyto alba (A)

Owls

Order: StrigiformesFamily: Strigidae

The typical owls are small to large solitary nocturnal birds of prey. They have large forward-facing eyes and ears, a hawk-like beak, and a conspicuous circle of feathers around each eye called a facial disk.

 Puerto Rican owl, Gymnasio nudipes
 Short-eared owl, Asio flammeus

Todies

Order: CoraciiformesFamily: Todidae

Todies are a group of small near passerine forest species endemic to the Caribbean. These birds have colorful plumage and resemble kingfishers, but have flattened bills with serrated edges. They eat small prey such as insects and lizards.

 Puerto Rican tody, Todus mexicanus (E)

Kingfishers
Order: CoraciiformesFamily: Alcedinidae

Kingfishers are medium-sized birds with large heads, long pointed bills, short legs, and stubby tails.

 Ringed kingfisher, Megaceryle torquatus (A)
 Belted kingfisher, Megaceryle alcyon

Woodpeckers
Order: PiciformesFamily: Picidae

Woodpeckers are small to medium-sized birds with chisel-like beaks, short legs, stiff tails, and long tongues used for capturing insects. Some species have feet with two toes pointing forward and two backward, while several species have only three toes. Many woodpeckers have the habit of tapping noisily on tree trunks with their beaks.

 Puerto Rican woodpecker, Melanerpes portoricensis (E)
 Yellow-bellied sapsucker, Sphyrapicus varius (A)
 Hairy woodpecker, Dryobates villosus (A)

Falcons and caracaras

Order: FalconiformesFamily: Falconidae

Falconidae is a family of diurnal birds of prey. They differ from hawks, eagles, and kites in that they kill with their beaks instead of their talons.

 American kestrel, Falco sparverius
 Merlin, Falco columbarius (A)
 Aplomado falcon, Falco femoralis (A)
 Peregrine falcon, Falco peregrinus

Cockatoos
Order: PsittaciformesFamily:  Cacatuidae

The cockatoos share many features with other parrots including the characteristic curved beak shape and a zygodactyl foot, with two forward toes and two backwards toes. They differ, however in a number of characteristics, including the often spectacular movable headcrest.

Sulphur-crested cockatoo, Cacatua galerita (I) 
White cockatoo, Cacatua alba (I)

New World and African parrots

Order: PsittaciformesFamily: Psittacidae

Characteristic features of parrots include a strong curved bill, an upright stance, strong legs, and clawed zygodactyl feet. Many parrots are vividly colored, and some are multi-colored. Most of the more than 150 species in this family are found in the New World.

 Monk parakeet, Myiopsitta monachus (I)
 Orange-fronted parakeet, Eupsittula canicularis (I)
 Brown-throated parakeet, Eupsittula pertinax (I)
 Nanday parakeet, Aratinga nenday (I)
 Blue-and-yellow macaw, Ara ararauna (I)
 Puerto Rican parakeet, Psittacara maugei  (E) (extinct)
 Red-masked parakeet,  Psittacara erythrogenys (I)
 Hispaniolan parakeet,  Psittacara choloropterus (I)
 White-winged parakeet Brotogeris versicolorus (I)
 Green-cheeked parakeet, Pyrrhura molinae (I)
 Orange-winged parrot, Amazona amazonica (I)
 White-fronted parrot, Amazona albifrons (I)
 Hispaniolan parrot, Amazona ventralis (I)
 Puerto Rican parrot, Amazona vittata (E)
 Red-crowned parrot, Amazona viridigenalis (I)
 Yellow-headed parrot, Amazona oratrix (I)
 Yellow-naped parrot, Amazona auropalliata (I)

Tyrant flycatchers

Order: PasseriformesFamily: Tyrannidae

Tyrant flycatchers are Passerine birds which occur throughout North and South America. They superficially resemble the Old World flycatchers, but are more robust and have stronger bills. They do not have the sophisticated vocal capabilities of the songbirds. Most, but not all, are rather plain. As the name implies, most are insectivorous.

 Caribbean elaenia, Elaenia martinica
 Great crested flycatcher, Myiarchus crinitus (A)
 Puerto Rican flycatcher, Myiarchus antillarum (E)
 Western kingbird, Tyrannus verticalis (A)
 Eastern kingbird, Tyrannus tyrannus (A)
 Gray kingbird, Tyrannus dominicensis
 Loggerhead kingbird, Tyrannus caudifasciatus
 Scissor-tailed flycatcher, Tyrannus forficatus (A)
 Fork-tailed flycatcher, Tyrannus savana (A)
 Eastern wood-pewee, Contopus virens (A)
 Hispaniolan pewee, Contopus hispaniolensis (A)
 Lesser Antillean pewee, Contopus latirostris
 Acadian flycatcher, Empidonax virescens (A)
 Willow flycatcher, Empidonax traillii (A)

Vireos, shrike-babblers, and erpornis
Order: PasseriformesFamily: Vireonidae

The vireos are a group of small to medium-sized passerine birds. They are typically greenish in color and resemble New World warblers apart from their heavier bills.

 White-eyed vireo, Vireo griseus (A)
 Puerto Rican vireo, Vireo latimeri (E)
 Yellow-throated vireo, Vireo flavifrons (A)
 Philadelphia vireo, Vireo philadelphicus (A)
 Warbling vireo, Vireo gilvus (A)
 Red-eyed vireo, Vireo olivaceus
 Black-whiskered vireo, Vireo altiloquus

Crows, jays, and magpies
Order: PasseriformesFamily: Corvidae

The family Corvidae includes crows, ravens, jays, choughs, magpies, treepies, nutcrackers, and ground jays. Corvids are above average in size among the Passeriformes, and some of the larger species show high levels of intelligence.

 White-necked crow, Corvus leucognaphalus (Ex)

Swallows

Order: PasseriformesFamily: Hirundinidae

The family Hirundinidae is adapted to aerial feeding. They have a slender streamlined body, long pointed wings, and a short bill with a wide gape. The feet are adapted to perching rather than walking, and the front toes are partially joined at the base.

 Bank swallow, Riparia riparia
 Tree swallow, Tachycineta bicolor (A)
 Violet-green swallow, Tachycineta thalassina (A)
 Northern rough-winged swallow, Stelgidopteryx serripennis (A)
 Brown-chested martin, Progne tapera (A)
 Purple martin, Progne subis (A)
 Cuban martin, Progne cryptoleuca (A)
 Caribbean martin, Progne dominicensis
 Barn swallow, Hirundo rustica
 Cliff swallow, Petrochelidon pyrrhonota (A)
 Cave swallow, Petrochelidon fulva

Waxwings
Order: PasseriformesFamily: Bombycillidae

The waxwings are a group of birds with soft silky plumage and unique red tips to some of the wing feathers. In the Bohemian and cedar waxwings, these tips look like sealing wax and give the group its name. These are arboreal birds of northern forests. They live on insects in summer and berries in winter.

 Cedar waxwing, Bombycilla cedrorum (A)

Mockingbirds and thrashers

Order: PasseriformesFamily: Mimidae

The mimids are a family of passerine birds that includes thrashers, mockingbirds, tremblers, and the New World catbirds. These birds are notable for their vocalization, especially their remarkable ability to mimic a wide variety of birds and other sounds heard outdoors. The species tend towards dull grays and browns in their appearance.

 Gray catbird, Dumetella carolinensis (A)
 Pearly-eyed thrasher, Margarops fuscatus
 Bahama mockingbird, Mimus gundlachii (A)
 Northern mockingbird, Mimus polyglottos

Starlings
Order: PasseriformesFamily: Sturnidae

Starlings and mynas are small to medium-sized Old World passerine birds with strong feet. Their flight is strong and direct and they are very gregarious. Their preferred habitat is fairly open country, and they eat insects and fruit. Plumage is typically dark with a metallic sheen.

 Common hill myna, Gracula religiosa (I)
 European starling, Sturnus vulgaris (I) (A)
 Common myna, Acridotheres tristis (I)

Thrushes and allies
Order: PasseriformesFamily: Turdidae

The Thrushes are a group of passerine birds that occur mainly but not exclusively in the Old World. They are plump, soft plumaged, small to medium-sized insectivores or sometimes omnivores, often feeding on the ground. Many have attractive songs.

 Veery, Catharus fuscescens (A)
 Gray-cheeked thrush, Catharus minimus (A)
 Bicknell's thrush, Catharus bicknelli (A)
 Swainson's thrush, Catharus ustulatus (A)
 Wood thrush, Hylocichla mustelina (A)
 American robin, Turdus migratorius (A)
 Red-legged thrush, Turdus plumbeus

Old World flycatchers
Order: PasseriformesFamily: Muscicapidae

Old World flycatchers are a large group of small passerine birds native to the Old World. They are mainly small arboreal insectivores. The appearance of these birds is highly varied, but they mostly have weak songs and harsh calls.

 Northern wheatear, Oenanthe oenanthe (A)

Weavers and allies
Order: PasseriformesFamily: Ploceidae

Weavers are a group of small passerine birds related to the finches. These are seed-eating birds with rounded conical bills, most of which breed in sub-Saharan Africa, with fewer species in tropical Asia. Weavers get their name from the large woven nests many species make. They are gregarious birds which often breed colonially.

 Northern red bishop, Euplectes franciscanus (I)
 Yellow-crowned bishop, Euplectes afer (I)

Indigobirds
Order: PasseriformesFamily: Viduidae

The Viduidae is a family of small passerine birds native to Africa that includes indigobirds and whydahs. All species are brood parasites which lay their eggs in the nests of estrildid finches. Species usually have black or indigo predominating in their plumage.

 Pin-tailed whydah, Vidua macroura (I)

Waxbills and allies
Order: PasseriformesFamily: Estrildidae

The estrildid finches are small passerine birds of the Old World tropics and Australasia. They are gregarious and often colonial seed eaters with short thick but pointed bills. They are all similar in structure and habits, but have wide variation in plumage colors and patterns.

 Bronze mannikin, Spermestes cucullata (I)
 Indian silverbill, Euodice malabarica (I)
 Java sparrow, Padda oryzivora (I)
 Scaly-breasted munia, Lonchura punctulata (I)
 Tricolored munia, Lonchura malacca (I)
 Chestnut munia, Lonchura atricapilla (I)
 Red avadavat, Amandava amandava (I)
 Orange-cheeked waxbill, Estrilda melpoda (I)
 Black-rumped waxbill, Estrilda troglodytes (I)

Old World sparrows

Order: PasseriformesFamily: Passeridae

Sparrows are small passerine birds. In general, sparrows tend to be small plump brownish or grayish birds with short tails and short powerful beaks. Sparrows are seed eaters, but they also consume small insects.

 House sparrow, Passer domesticus (I)

Finches, euphonias, and allies
Order: PasseriformesFamily: Fringillidae

Finches are seed-eating passerine birds, that are small to moderately large and have a strong beak, usually conical and in some species very large. All have twelve tail feathers and nine primaries. These birds have a bouncing flight with alternating bouts of flapping and gliding on closed wings, and most sing well.

 Antillean euphonia, Chlorophonia musica
 Yellow-fronted canary, Crithagra mozambica (I) (A)
 Red siskin, Spinus cucullata (I)
 Island canary, Serinus canaria (I)

New World sparrows

Order: PasseriformesFamily: Passerellidae

Until 2017, these species were considered part of the family Emberizidae. Most of the species are known as sparrows, but these birds are not closely related to the Old World sparrows which are in the family Passeridae. Many of these have distinctive head patterns.

 Grasshopper sparrow, Ammodramus savannarum
 Dark-eyed junco, Junco hyemalis (A)
 White-throated sparrow, Zonotrichia albicollis (A)
 Lincoln's sparrow, Melospiza lincolnii (A)

Puerto Rican tanager
Order: PasseriformesFamily: Nesospingidae

This species was formerly classified as a tanager (family Thraupidae) but was placed in its own family in 2017.

 Puerto Rican tanager, Nesospingus speculiferus (E)

Spindalises
Order: PasseriformesFamily: Spindalidae

The members of this small family are native to the Greater Antilles. They were formerly classified as tanagers but were placed in their own family in 2017.

 Puerto Rican spindalis, Spindalis portoricensis (E)

Troupials and allies

Order: PasseriformesFamily: Icteridae

The icterids are a group of small to medium-sized, often colorful passerine birds restricted to the New World and include the grackles, New World blackbirds, and New World orioles. Most species have black as a predominant plumage color, often enlivened by yellow, orange, or red.

 Yellow-headed blackbird, Xanthocephalus xanthocephalus (A)
 Bobolink, Dolichonyx oryzivorus (A)
 Puerto Rican oriole, Icterus portoricensis (E)
 Orchard oriole, Icterus spurius (A)
 Venezuelan troupial, Icterus icterus (I)
 Bullock's oriole, Icterus bullockii (A)
 Baltimore oriole, Icterus galbula (A)
 Red-winged blackbird, Agelaius phoeniceus (A)
 Yellow-shouldered blackbird, Agelaius xanthomus (E)
 Shiny cowbird, Molothrus bonariensis
 Brown-headed cowbird, Molothrus ater (A)
 Great-tailed grackle, Quiscalus mexicanus (A)
 Greater Antillean grackle, Quiscalus niger
 Yellow-hooded blackbird, Chrysomus icterocephalus (A)

New World warblers

Order: PasseriformesFamily: Parulidae

The wood-warblers are a group of small often colorful passerine birds restricted to the New World. Most are arboreal, but some are more terrestrial. Most members of this family are insectivores.

 Ovenbird, Seiurus aurocapilla
 Worm-eating warbler, Helmitheros vermivorum (A)
 Louisiana waterthrush, Parkesia motacilla
 Northern waterthrush, Parkesia noveboracensis
 Golden-winged warbler, Vermivora chrysoptera (A)
 Blue-winged warbler, Vermivora cyanoptera (A)
 Black-and-white warbler, Mniotilta varia
 Prothonotary warbler, Protonotaria citrea (A)
 Swainson's warbler, Limnothlypis swainsonii (A)
 Tennessee warbler, Leieothlypis peregrina (A)
 Nashville warbler, Leieothlypis ruficapilla (A)
 Connecticut warbler, Oporornis agilis (A)
 Mourning warbler, Geothlypis philadelphia (A)
 Kentucky warbler, Geothlypis formosa (A)
 Common yellowthroat, Geothlypis trichas
 Elfin-woods warbler, Setophaga angelae (E)
 Hooded warbler, Setophaga citrina (A)
 American redstart, Setophaga ruticilla
 Cape May warbler, Setophaga tigrina
 Cerulean warbler, Setophaga cerulea (A)
 Northern parula, Setophaga americana
 Magnolia warbler, Setophaga magnolia (A)
 Bay-breasted warbler, Setophaga castanea (A)
 Blackburnian warbler, Setophaga fusca (A)
 Yellow warbler, Setophaga petechia
 Chestnut-sided warbler, Setophaga pensylvanica (A)
 Blackpoll warbler, Setophaga striata
 Black-throated blue warbler, Setophaga caerulescens
 Palm warbler, Setophaga palmarum (A)
 Pine warbler, Setophaga pinus (A)
 Yellow-rumped warbler, Setophaga coronata (A)
 Yellow-throated warbler, Setophaga dominica (A)
 Prairie warbler, Setophaga discolor
 Adelaide's warbler, Setophaga adelaidae (E)
 Townsend's warbler, Setophaga townsendi (A)
 Black-throated green warbler, Setophaga virens (A)
 Canada warbler, Cardellina canadensis (A)
 Wilson's warbler, Cardellina pusilla (A)

Cardinals and allies
Order: PasseriformesFamily: Cardinalidae

The cardinals are a family of robust, seed-eating birds with strong bills. They are typically associated with open woodland. The sexes usually have distinct plumages.

 Summer tanager, Piranga rubra (A)
 Scarlet tanager, Piranga olivacea (A)
 Rose-breasted grosbeak, Pheucticus ludovicianus (A)
 Blue grosbeak, Passerina caerulea (A)
 Indigo bunting, Passerina cyanea (A)
 Dickcissel, Spiza americana (A)

Tanagers and allies
Order: PasseriformesFamily: Thraupidae

The tanagers are a large group of small to medium-sized passerine birds restricted to the New World, mainly in the tropics. Many species are brightly colored. As a family they are omnivorous, but individual species specialize in eating fruits, seeds, insects, or other types of food.

 Red-crested cardinal, Paroaria coronata (I)
 Saffron finch, Sicalis flaveola (I)
 Bananaquit, Coereba flaveola
 Yellow-faced grassquit, Tiaris olivaceus
 Puerto Rican bullfinch, Melopyrrha portoricensis (E)
 Lesser Antillean bullfinch, Loxigilla noctis (A)
 Black-faced grassquit, Melanospiza bicolor

See also

 Fauna of Puerto Rico
 List of birds
 List of birds of North America
 List of endemic fauna of Puerto Rico
 List of Vieques birds
 El Toro Wilderness

References

Further reading
 
 

'
birds
Puerto Rico
Puerto Rico